Akmal Irgashev (born 16 December 1982) is a taekwondo athlete from Uzbekistan.  He finished in 5th place at the 2008 Summer Olympics, losing in the quarter-finals to eventual champion Cha Dong-min, and then to Chika Chukwumerije in the repechage.  He also competed at the London Olympics 2012. He was the Bronze Medalist in Taekwondo at the 2010 Asian Games.

References

External links
 
 

1982 births
Living people
Uzbekistani male taekwondo practitioners
Olympic taekwondo practitioners of Uzbekistan
Taekwondo practitioners at the 2008 Summer Olympics
Taekwondo practitioners at the 2012 Summer Olympics
Asian Games medalists in taekwondo
Taekwondo practitioners at the 2006 Asian Games
Taekwondo practitioners at the 2010 Asian Games
Asian Games bronze medalists for Uzbekistan
Medalists at the 2010 Asian Games
20th-century Uzbekistani people
21st-century Uzbekistani people